Dharumar was a Tamil poet, scholar, and commentator known for his commentary on the Thirukkural. He was among the canon of Ten Medieval Commentators of the Kural text most highly esteemed by modern scholars. His work, however, has been lost along with other four ancient commentators, namely, Dhamatthar, Nacchar, Thirumalaiyar, and Mallar. He was also one of the three ancient commentators of the Naladiyar.

Biography
There is not much known about Dharumar. Dharumar is believed to have lived around 11th to 13th century CE. Apart from the Tirukkural, Dharumar has also written commentary to Naladiyar.

See also

 Ten Medieval Commentators
 Bhashya
 Commentaries in Tamil literary tradition

References

Further reading
 M. Arunachalam (2005). Tamil Ilakkiya Varalaru, Padhinaindhaam Nootraandu [History of Tamil Literature, 15th century].
 
 D. M. Vellaivaaranam (1983). Tirukkural Uraikotthu. Thiruppananthal Shri Kasimadam Publications.

Tirukkural
Tamil poets
Tirukkural commentators
Ten medieval commentators
Medieval Tamil poets
Tamil-language writers
Tamil scholars
Scholars from Tamil Nadu